Events from the year 1979 in the United Arab Emirates.

Incumbents
President: Zayed bin Sultan Al Nahyan 
Prime Minister: Maktoum bin Rashid Al Maktoum (until 25 April), Rashid bin Saeed Al Maktoum (starting 25 April)

Establishments
Sharjah Indian School.

References

 
Years of the 20th century in the United Arab Emirates
United Arab Emirates
United Arab Emirates
1970s in the United Arab Emirates